The Tasmania cricket team's List A records.

Team totals

Highest team totals

Highest team totals against

Lowest team totals

Lowest team totals against

Greatest win margins (by runs)

Individual records

Most matches played

Most catches (fielder)

Most dismissals

Batting records

Highest individual scores

Most career runs

Most runs in a season

Highest batting averages

Most centuries

List A partnership records

Bowling records

Most career wickets

Most wickets in a season

Best career average

Best figures in an innings

Tasmania List A cricket records
Records,List A